Bountiful Peak is a  mountain summit located in Davis County, Utah, United States.

Description
Bountiful Peak is situated in the Wasatch Range which is a subset of the Rocky Mountains, and it is set on land managed by Wasatch-Cache National Forest. The community of Bountiful is six miles to the south-southwest and Farmington is four miles to the northwest. Precipitation runoff from the mountain's slopes ultimately drains to Great Salt Lake. Skyline Drive and the Great Western Trail traverse the peak, providing an approach option. This landform's toponym has been officially adopted by the U.S. Board on Geographic Names and is named in association with the nearby town, which in turn refers to Bountiful in the Book of Mormon. On November 4, 1940, United Airlines Flight 16 struck Bountiful Peak due to navigational equipment failure while on an Oakland-Salt Lake City passenger service, killing all 10 on board.

See also
 
 List of mountain peaks of Utah

References

External links
Bountiful Peak: weather forecast
 National Geodetic Survey Data Sheet

Mountains of Utah
Mountains of Davis County, Utah
North American 2000 m summits
Wasatch-Cache National Forest
Wasatch Range